The following lists events that happened during 1954 in Chile.

Incumbents
President of Chile: Carlos Ibáñez del Campo

Events

March
17 March -  The young Argentine dancer Nélida Lobato performs at the  theatre Bim-Bam-Bum in Santiago.

September
3 September – 50,000 workers in Chile strike, leading the government to threaten measures against the strikers.
21 September - Clarin is founded, edited in Santiago and directed by Darío Sainte Marie.

Births
date unknown – Humberto Nilo
14 January – Cecilia Morel
26 April – Sonia Tschorne
13 May – Jorge Garcés
7 June – Jaime Mañalich
13 June – Manuel Rojas (footballer)
30 June – Alastair MacGregor Martin
6 July – Francisco Reyes Morandé
9 August – Vladimir Bigorra
9 August – Kike Morandé
15 October – Miguel Piñera
22 October – Emilio Ulloa
3 November – Carlos Conca
14 November – Eliseo Salazar

Deaths
28 January – Abraham Oyanedel (b. 1874)
15 May – Marmaduke Grove (b. 1878)
25 October – Manuel Trucco (b. 1875)

References 

 
Years of the 20th century in Chile
Chile